These are the team rosters of the nations participating in the women's ice hockey tournament of the 2010 Winter Olympics.

Group A

The following is the Canadian roster in the women's ice hockey tournament of the 2010 Winter Olympics.

The following is the Slovak roster in the women's ice hockey tournament of the 2010 Winter Olympics.

The following is the Swedish roster in the women's ice hockey tournament of the 2010 Winter Olympics.

The following is the Swiss roster in the women's ice hockey tournament of the 2010 Winter Olympics.

Group B

The following is the Chinese roster in the women's ice hockey tournament of the 2010 Winter Olympics.

The following is the Finnish roster in the women's ice hockey tournament of the 2010 Winter Olympics.

The following is the Russian roster in the women's ice hockey tournament of the 2010 Winter Olympics.

Head coach:  Valentin Gureev    Assistant coach:  Alexei Chistyakov

The following is the American roster in the women's ice hockey tournament of the 2010 Winter Olympics.

Head coach:  Mark Johnson    Assistant coach:  Dave Flint

See also
 Ice hockey at the 2010 Winter Olympics – Men's team rosters

References

rosters

2010